Ibrahim Muhammad Didi (March 20, 1902 - October 6, 1981), (also known as Velaanaagey Ibrahim Didi) was Vice President of Maldives. While people demanded him to be president on terms that the vacancy of the office of the President leads to the succession of the vice president to the presidency, Ibrahim Didi served as acting president from September 2, 1953, to March 7, 1954, after the banishment of Mohamed Amin Didi.

He was appointed minister of finance of the Maldives Sultanate from July 1954 to November 1955.

References

External Links 

Presidents of the Maldives
Vice presidents of the Maldives
Finance ministers of the Maldives
Rayyithunge Muthagaddim Party politicians
1902 births
1981 deaths
People from Malé
Maldivian Muslims